In history, religion and political science, a purge is a position removal or execution of people who are considered undesirable by those in power from a government, another organization, their team leaders, or society as a whole. A group undertaking such an effort is labeled as purging itself. Purges can be either nonviolent or violent, with the former often resolved by the simple removal of those who have been purged from office, and the latter often resolved by the imprisonment, exile, or murder of those who have been purged.

Characteristics
The Shanghai massacre of 1927 and the Night of the Long Knives of 1934, in which the leader of a political party turns against a particular section or group within the party and kills its members, are commonly called "purges" while mass expulsions on grounds of racism and xenophobia, such as the deportation of the Crimean Tatars are not.

Though sudden and violent purges are notable, most purges do not involve immediate execution or imprisonment, for example the periodic massive purges of the Communist Party of Czechoslovakia on grounds of apathy or dereliction, or the purge of Jews and political dissenters from the German Civil Service in 1933–1934. Chairman Mao Zedong and his associates purged much of the Chinese Communist Party's leadership, including the head of state, President Liu Shaoqi and the then-Secretary-General, Deng Xiaoping, beginning in 1966 as part of the Cultural Revolution. In Maoist states, sentences usually involved hard labor in laogai camps and executions. Deng Xiaoping acquired a reputation for returning to power after he had been purged several times.

Historical use of the term

English Civil War purge, 1648–1650

The earliest use of the term dates back to the English Civil War's Pride's Purge. In 1648–1650, the moderate members of the English Long Parliament were purged by the New Model Army. The Parliament of England would suffer subsequent purges under Oliver Cromwell's Commonwealth of England including the purge of the entire House of Lords. Counter-revolutionaries such as royalists were purged as well as more radical revolutionaries such as the Levellers. After the Stuart Restoration, obstinate republicans were purged while some fled to the New England Colonies in British America.

Stalinist Soviet Union

The term "purge" is often associated with Stalinism. While leading the USSR, Joseph Stalin imprisoned in Gulag-labor camps and executed rival communists, military officers, ethnic minorities, wreckers, and citizens accused of plotting against Communism. Stalin together with Nikolai Yezhov initiated the most notorious of the CPSU purges, the Great Purge, during the 1930s.

France after WWII

After France's liberation by the Allies in 1944, the Provisional Government of the French Republic and particularly the French Resistance carried out purges of former collaborationists, the so-called "vichystes". The process became known in legal terms as épuration légale ("legal purging"). Similar processes in other countries and on other occasions included denazification in Allied-occupied Germany and decommunization in post-communist states.

Communist Cuba

After the Cuban Revolution in 1959, Fidel Castro of Cuba often purged those who had previously been involved with the Batista regime. Purges often involved the execution of the condemned. Castro periodically carried out purges in the Communist Party of Cuba thereafter. One prominent purge was carried out in 1989, when a high-ranking Cuban Revolutionary Armed Forces general named Arnaldo Ochoa was sentenced to death and executed by firing squad on charges of drug trafficking. Purges became less common in Cuba during the 1990s and 2000s.

In the 21st century

China 
Some observers consider the anti-corruption campaign under Xi Jinping to be a purge. A far-reaching campaign against corruption began in China following the conclusion of the 18th National Congress of the Chinese Communist Party in 2012. The campaign, carried out under the aegis of Xi Jinping, General Secretary of the Chinese Communist Party, was the largest organized purported anti-graft effort in the history of Communist rule in China.

North Korea

Members of the Kim family have each periodically purged their political rivals or perceived threats since consolidating their control over North Korea, beginning in the 1950s. The most senior Kim purged those who opposed his son's succession to the supreme leadership of North Korea. Kim Il-sung's most prominent purge occurred during the "August Incident" in 1956, when the pro-Soviet and pro-Chinese Yanan factions of the Workers' Party of Korea (WPK) attempted to depose Kim. Most of those involved in the plot were executed while some others fled to the USSR and China. While some purges were carried out under Kim Jong-il, they were not as common as they were under his father/son. Kim Jong-un purged a number of high-ranking officials and generals installed by his father Kim Jong-il in the former's first years in power, including, most prominently, his uncle Jang Song-thaek.

Turkey

After the failed 2016 Turkish coup d'état attempt, the Government of Turkey under Recep Tayyip Erdoğan began a purge against members of its own civil service and the Turkish Armed Forces. The purge ostensibly focused mainly on public servants and soldiers alleged to be part of the Gülen movement, the group the government blamed for the coup. As part of the purge, about 200,000 public officials, including thousands of judges, were dismissed and detained. Politicized Turkish-Kurds have also been a major target of the Justice and Development Party-led purge.

See also
 Catharsis
 Genocide
 Great Purge
 Lustration
 Extrajudicial killing
 Political cleansing of population
 Political repression
 Proscription
 Reign of Terror
 Struggle Session
 Martial law under Ferdinand Marcos
 Dirty War
 1979 Ba'ath Party Purge

References 

 
Political repression
Persecution
Informal legal terminology
Historical negationism